The Annam keelback (Hebius annamensis) is a species of snake in the family Colubridae. It is found in Vietnam.

References 

Hebius
Snakes of Vietnam
Endemic fauna of Vietnam
Reptiles described in 1934
Taxa named by René Léon Bourret